Codi Dalton Heuer (born July 3, 1996) is an American professional baseball pitcher for the Chicago Cubs of Major League Baseball (MLB).  He played college baseball at Wichita State University. He previously played for the Chicago White Sox. He made his MLB debut in 2020.

Amateur career
Heuer was born and raised in Missoula, Montana, before moving to Fort Collins, Colorado before he began high school. Following the move, he attended Fossil Ridge High School in Fort Collins. In 2015, his senior year, he threw a complete game shutout in which he struck out 17 batters, a school record.

He went undrafted in the 2015 Major League Baseball draft, and enrolled at Wichita State University where he played college baseball for the Shockers. In 2016, his freshman season at Wichita State, he appeared in 21 games (making two starts) in which he went 1–1 with a 9.12 ERA in  innings, and as a sophomore in 2017, he pitched to a 2–2 record and 4.42 ERA in  innings. In 2018, his junior year, he was Wichita State's Friday night starter, going 6–5 with a 4.31 ERA over 16 games (15 starts).

Professional career

Chicago White Sox
After his junior year, Heuer was selected by the Chicago White Sox in the sixth round of the 2018 Major League Baseball draft. He signed and made his professional debut with the Great Falls Voyagers. He made 14 starts, going 0–1 with a 4.74 ERA over 38 innings, as the Voyagers won the Pioneer League crown. In 2019, he moved to the bullpen, and began the year with the Winston-Salem Dash before being promoted to the Birmingham Barons in June. Over 42 relief appearances between the two clubs, Heuer went 6–4 with a 2.39 ERA, striking out 65 over  innings.

On July 23, 2020, it was announced that Heuer had been named to the White Sox 2020 Opening Day roster. He made his MLB debut the next night against the Minnesota Twins, striking out one and pitching a scoreless inning. With the 2020 Chicago White Sox, Heuer appeared in 21 games, compiling a 3-0 record with 1.52 ERA and 25 strikeouts in  innings pitched. For the 2021 White Sox, Heuer went 4-1 with a 5.12 ERA and 39 strikeouts over  innings.

Chicago Cubs
On July 30, 2021, Heuer was traded along with Nick Madrigal to the Chicago Cubs for Craig Kimbrel. Heuer appeared in 25 games for the Cubs in which he went 3-3 with a 3.14 ERA and 17 strikeouts over  innings. On March 8, 2022, Heuer underwent Tommy John surgery, ending his 2022 season before it began.

On January 13, 2023, Heuer agreed to a one-year, $785,000 contract with the Cubs, avoiding salary arbitration.

References

External links

1996 births
Living people
Baseball players from Montana
Birmingham Barons players
Chicago Cubs players
Chicago White Sox players
Great Falls Voyagers players
Major League Baseball pitchers
Sportspeople from Missoula, Montana
Wichita State Shockers baseball players
Winston-Salem Dash players